Windfalls is a British stop motion-animated children's television series created, written, and directed by Jenny Kenna. The Windfalls stories teach children about reading signs in nature, herbal medicine, and the plants of the British countryside. All of the animated characters are real leaves, grasses, and pressed flowers.

The stories follow three friends: Berry, Butterbur, and Rosebay. They are Windfalls, and they live in Windfall Land. They meet many other Windfalls on their adventures. The programme features a cast of 21 supporting characters, each designed from a different plant: Daisy, Evening Primrose, Pampas, Fern Polypody, Thistle, Cowslip, Delphinium, Uncle Onion, Cornflower, Lucky Four Leaf Clover, Vi, Ola, Pansy, Bella Donna, Twitch Grass, Couch Grass, Holly, Ivy, Nettle, Dock, and Daffodil.

Windfalls was produced by FilmFair and Central Independent Television for ITV; it premiered on 14 April 1989, and ran for 26 episodes. Two episodes were transmitted back-to-back for each broadcast. When the series was syndicated on other networks, such as the Australian Broadcasting Corporation in Australia, Knowledge Network and TVO in Canada, Channel 5 in Singapore and TVNZ's Channel 2 in New Zealand, the episodes were broadcast singly. The series was also broadcast on the military channel BFBS in Germany as well as in several countries including Cyprus and Falkland Islands but with the series transmitted back to back with two episodes just like its original UK television airings.

The programme was animated by Isabelle Perrichon, who later worked on the FilmFair animated series Rod 'n' Emu (1991).

Episodes

Home releases
Little Croft Studios distributed 18 of the 26 episodes of the series on three VHS videotapes, sold separately. Each volume has six stories:

Learn to Love Nature with the Windfalls
"Light and Shade", "The Oak Tree", "The Red Toadstool", "Autumn in Windfall Land", "The Invaders", "Winter in Windfall Land"
Learn to Love the Countryside with the Windfalls
"Country Cousins", "Weather Signs", "Lucky", "Flying Flowers", "Bramble Shrub", "Nettle and Dock"
Learn to Love the Flowers and the Trees with the Windfalls
"Fine Weather Friend", "Bella Donna", "An Evening with Primrose", "Butterbur's Marsh", "Cowslip Needs Protection", "Honey Day"

Notes

References
Windfalls at the BFI Film & TV Database. Retrieved 4 January 2013.
. Retrieved 4 January 2013.
. Retrieved 4 January 2013.

External links
Windfalls, an episode guide at Toonarific. Retrieved 6 January 2013.

1989 British television series debuts
1989 British television series endings
1980s British children's television series
British children's animated adventure television series
ITV children's television shows
English-language television shows
British stop-motion animated television series
Television series by FilmFair
Television series by DHX Media
Television series by ITV Studios
Television shows produced by Central Independent Television
1980s British animated television series